Gerald Gordon Field (born 1954) is an Anglican priest.

Field was educated at King's College London and the College of the Resurrection Mirfield; and ordained in 1978. After curacies at  Broughton and Blackburn he held incumbencies in Skerton, Shap, All Souls, Netherton and Tullamore. He has been Dean of Cashel since 2014.

References

1954 births
Living people
Deans of Cashel
Alumni of King's College London
Alumni of the College of the Resurrection